Tanea hollmanni is a species of sea snail, a marine gastropoda mollusk in the family Naticidae.

Distribution
This marine species occurs off the Philippines.

Original description
 Poppe G.T., Tagaro S.P. & Stahlschmidt P. (2015). New shelled molluscan species from the central Philippines I. Visaya. 4(3): 15-59. page(s): 23, pl. 7 figs 1-3 .

References

External links
 Worms Link

Naticidae